Alex Noerdin (born 9 September 1950) is a former Governor of South Sumatra between 2008 and 2018.

He was born in Palembang, South Sumatra on 9 September 1950. He served as regent in Banyuasin for 2 consecutive terms (2001–2006 and 2007–2012). On 14 June 2008, in the second term, he resigned to be a candidate to be governor of South Sumatra in the local elections for the 2008 to 2013 period.

He became governor on 7 November 2008. His second term ended slightly earlier than scheduled on 21 September 2018, and he was replaced by Herman Deru.

References

1950 births
Governors of South Sumatra
Living people
Indonesian people of Malay descent
People from Palembang
Golkar politicians
Moroccan people of Malay descent
Saudi Arabian people of Malay descent